The Arta–Volos line or Ambracian–Pagasetic line was the land border of the Kingdom of Greece and the Ottoman Empire between 1832 and the Annexation of Thessaly in 1881. It was named after the two principal cities in proximity of the border on the Ottoman side, Arta and Volos, and the Ambracian Gulf and the Pagasetic Gulf between which it extended.

The border had been proposed by the Great Powers in the London Protocol of 1829 as the northern boundary of an autonomous Greek state under Ottoman suzerainty, but when the full independence of Greece was agreed on in the London Protocol of 1830, the borders of the new state were reduced to the Aspropotamos–Spercheios line, only to be again expanded in the London Conference of 1832, which was confirmed by the Treaty of Constantinople (1832).

See also
 Accession of the Ionian Islands to Greece

References

External links
 ГЪРЦИЯ. Баварократия (1833 – 1843) (in Bulgarian)

1832 establishments in Greece
1832 establishments in the Ottoman Empire
1832 in international relations
1881 disestablishments in Greece
1881 disestablishments in the Ottoman Empire
1881 in international relations
Borders of Greece
Borders of the Ottoman Empire
History of Greece (1832–1862)
Greece–Ottoman Empire relations
History of Greece (1863–1909)